is a village located in Tagawa District, Fukuoka Prefecture, Japan. It is at the foot of Mount Hiko.

As of April 1, 2017, the village has an estimated population of 2,960 and a density of 92 persons per km². The total area is 32.03 km².

References

External links

Aka official website 

Villages in Fukuoka Prefecture